Cigaritis brunnea, the little bar, is a butterfly in the family Lycaenidae. It is found in Uganda, western Tanzania, the Democratic Republic of the Congo (Kivu), Zambia and north-western and south-eastern Zimbabwe.

References

Butterflies described in 1966
Cigaritis